AEC (Alashki Engineering Constructions, in Bulgarian: АЕС, formerly Engproject Ltd.) is a Bulgarian structural and civil engineering company, located in Sofia, Bulgaria. It was founded in 1996 by Dr. Ilia Alashki. Main activities of the company are engineering of reinforced concrete structures, steel and wooden structures, hydraulic structures, deep excavations and special foundations.

Software Development
From 1997 to 2002 the company president - Dr Ilia Alashki developed software named GaLa Reinforcement as a part of his PhD thesis. GaLa Reinforcement is a program for advanced design and analysis of reinforced concrete elements (columns, beams, shear walls) subjected to axial force and axial or bi-axial bending moments (N, Mx, My). The program calculates the necessary reinforcement, checks the R/C sections capacity, generate interaction failure surfaces, calculates the strains, stresses, curvatures, stiffnesses (II order, creep) and the cracks widths for any reinforced concrete cross - section.
The program has reported users in over 30 countries: 
Germany, USA, Italy, Belgium, Canada, Netherlands, Spain, Portugal, Sweden, Iceland, UK, South Korea, Greece, Columbia, Bulgaria, Singapore, Saipan, China, Taiwan, Vietnam, El Salvador, Brazil, Ireland, Mexico, Chile, Turkey, New Zealand, France, Haiti, Slovenia, Nicaragua, Philippines, Saudi Arabia, Qatar, Austria, United Arab Emirates.

Notable Projects

Trade centers
City Mall of Banja Luka, Banja Luka, Bosnia and Herzegovina
Paradise Center, Sofia, Bulgaria 
Grand Mall, Varna, Bulgaria
Mall Varna, Bulgaria
Plaza West, Sofia, Bulgaria
Mega Mall Liulin, Sofia, Bulgaria

Airports
Sofia Airport Terminal 2, Sofia, Bulgaria

Residential buildings
Advanced Architectural Apartments, Sofia, Bulgaria
Red Apple, Sofia, Bulgaria

Seismic retrofits
Vasil Levski National Stadium, Sofia, Bulgaria

Awards
2011 - Hotel Gallery Graffiti, Varna – winner - Building of the year 2011 Bulgaria – category: Hotels and Resorts 
2013 - Red Apple, Sofia - winner - Building of the year 2013 Bulgaria – category: Residential buildings 
2013 - Paradise Center, Sofia – winner - Building of the year 2013 Bulgaria – category: Trade buildings

References

External links
Company website

Construction and civil engineering companies of Bulgaria
Companies based in Sofia
Construction and civil engineering companies established in 1996
Bulgarian companies established in 1996